John William Mills  (born 4 March 1933, London) is an English sculptor.

He studied at Hammersmith School of Art, 1947–54, and at the Royal College of Art, 1956–60. He was a resident at Digswell House 1962–66, and currently lives at Hinxworth Place in Hertfordshire.

Teaching 

Various part-time teaching posts in UK from 1958 to 1962:
 Full-time at St. Albans School of Art and Hertfordshire College of Art and Design, 1962–77
 Visiting Associate Professor in Printmaking and Sculpture, Eastern Michigan University, 1970–71
 Visiting lecturer Detroit School of Creative Arts, 1970–71
 Visiting Professor and Artist in Residence University of Michigan, 1980.

Awards 

 Fellow of the Royal British Society of Sculptors, 1982
 Otto Beit medal, Royal British Society of Sculptors, 1983 (for the sculpture 'Curved Neck Grace')
 President of the Society, 1986, and again in 1997
 Fellow of the Royal Society of Arts, 1993
 Honorary Master of Arts, University College Northampton, 2000

Work in public places 

 William Blake Memorial (Blake House, London)
 Blitz the National Firefighters Memorial (South side of St. Paul's Cathedral, London)
 London River Man (Isle of Dogs, London)
 John Jorrocks (Croydon, London)
 Family Outing (Thames Centre, Newton Aycliffe, County Durham, England)
 Brothers (University Hospital, Ann Arbor, Michigan USA)
 Swimmers (Cambridge swimming pool, Cambridge, England)
 Diver (Eastern Michigan University, USA)
 St George (Windsor Court Hotel, New Orleans, USA)
 Degas Dancing (La Cabaña Restaurant, Buenos Aires, Argentina)
 Thoughtful Girl (Clark University, Worcester, Massachusetts, USA)
 The Thrower (Ernest Bevin School, Tooting, London)
 Boy With Cat (Highfields, Hemel Hempstead, England)
 Lion (Ward Freeman School, Buntingford, Hertfordshire, England)
 The Unicorn and Wellcome Wellcome Foundation, Beckenham, Kent, England)
 Road Research (Road Research Laboratories, Crowthorne, England)
 The Risen Christ, St Mary's Church, Ashwell, Hertfordshire, England)
 Sir Thomas Sopwith (Brooklands Museum, Brooklands, England)
 Sir Lawrence Bragg, (The Royal Institution, London)
 Jackie Milburn Memorial (Ashington, Northumberland, England)
 The Meeting, Harpur Square, Bedford, Bedfordshire, England
 Chinese Reference, Harlow, Essex, England (Tesco Site)
 Quadriga, fountain Charleston Place Hotel, Charleston, South Carolina, USA
 Time, Cavendish Hotel (Chatsworth House Estate) Derbyshire, England
 The Risen Christ, Church of Great St Mary, Sawbridgeworth, Essex, England
 Campus Thoughts, University College Northampton, England
 Memorial to Alan Turing, University of Surrey, Guildford, England
 Lion and the Unicorn and Digitalis, William Harvey Centre, Charterhouse Square, London
 Monument to the Women of World War II Whitehall, London

Competitions 
 Winner of the design competition for 'The Topham Trophy' 1961 and 1962.
 Winner of the RBS silver medal in 1991 for 'Blitz'.
 Winner of the Royal Mint design competition for the 'D-Day fifty pence coin 1993'.
 Winner of the Royal Mint design competition for the 'VE Day two pound coin 1994'.
 Winner of the Royal Mint design competition for the Euro Cup two pound coin 1995.
 Winner of the Coin of the Year award (Krause Publications) for the D-Day fifty pence 1994.
 Winner of the Royal Mint design competition for the Euro Cent, British entry for the European Competition 1996.
 Winner of the Royal Mint design competition for the 25th anniversary of the our entry into the Common Market fifty pence coin 1997.
 Winner of the Royal Mint design competition for the 50th anniversary of DNA Double helix two pound coin.

Published works 
 Sculpture in Ciment Fondu, 1958 (Contractors Record, London).
 The Technique of Sculpture 1962 (B.T.Batsford, London).
 Sculpture in Concrete, 1966 (McClaren, London ).
 The Technique of Casting for Sculpture 1968 (B.T.Batsford, London).
 Studio Bronze Casting 1969 (McClaren, London), this book was written in collaboration with Michael Gillespie ARBS.
 Modelling the Figure and Head 1978 (B.T.Batsford, London).
 Encyclopaedia of Sculpture Techniques 1989 (B.T.Batsford, London).
 Catalogue contribution for Chelsea Harbour 93 (RBS) 1993.
 Sculpture 108, Contributed article 'What I didn't learn at Art School' Spring issue 1997
 Sculpting the Human Figure 2006 (Crowood Press)

References 

'Blitz' Firefighters Memorial
Memorial to the Women of World War II Fund
H.M.Queen Elizabeth II unveiling Women of World War II Monument
John W Mills Images of Quentin Crisp

1933 births
Living people
English male sculptors
Modern sculptors
Alumni of the Royal College of Art
Sculptors from London
People from Balham